The Treaty of Friendship, Commerce and Navigation between Austria-Hungary and Japan was signed in Tokyo on October 18, 1869.

References

1869 in the United Kingdom
1869 in Japan
Treaties of Austria-Hungary
Treaties of the Empire of Japan
October 1869 events